Frank Fois (born January 15, 1993) is an Italian rock and blues guitarist, singer, and songwriter from Sassari, Italy.

Career
Fois started to play the guitar at three years old, and soon he showed a passion for music especially for the blues. He performed for the first time in Sardinia, in a concert organized by UNICEF where he played some original songs. After that, he played in many others theatres of Italy.

At age six, Fois did his first studio recording. Soon after, he participated in several competitions in Italy and finished as the winner.

Fois started attending the Conservatory of Music in 2006 studying classical guitar.
During his Music tour in 2013, Fois performed in Australia, the United States and in different European Countries: Germany, France, United Kingdom, Italy.

After moving to New York City in 2014, Fois performed in the blues clubs of Manhattan and Long Island including the "BB King Blues Club", Terra Blues, Rockwood Music Hall, and many others, also jamming with various well known musicians. 
In 2015 Fois founded his own Entertainment company, "FFI Entertainment". In 2016, Fois is touring with his band in the United States and in Europe.

Discography
Red House (2015)
World Keep on Turning (2015)
Greatest Hits - Live in NYC (2016)

References

External links
 Official website

1993 births
Living people
Italian blues guitarists
Italian rock guitarists
Italian male guitarists
Lead guitarists
Italian male  songwriters
Blues rock musicians
Electric blues musicians
21st-century Italian  male singers
21st-century guitarists